Mikhail Georgievich Pervukhin (14 October 1904 – 22 July 1978) was a Soviet official during the Stalin Era and Khrushchev Era. He served as a First Deputy Chairman of the Council of Ministers, literally First Vice-Premier of the Soviet Union, from 1955 to 1957.

Early life and career
He was born on 14 October 1904 in the village of Yuryuzansky Zavod, Ufa governorate, Russian Empire to a Russian working-class family. Pervukhin became a member of the Russian Communist Party in 1919. In August to September 1919 Pervukhin was a member of the Zlatoust city commission on the nationalisation of property belonging to the bourgeoisie. He began working for the Zlatoust newspaper Borba in October 1919, and worked there until February 1920 when he started to attend after-school lessons. He fought alongside the Bolsheviks in the Russian Civil War in the South Urals. From October to November 1920 Pervukhin was a member of the Bolshevik squad quelling the anti-Bolshevik uprising in Chrysostom.

From January 1921 to mid-autumn Pervukhin worked as the Executive Secretary of the Proletarian Thought. He was a member of the Bureau of the Zlatoust Komsomol District Committee, and later became the head of its Department for Political Education in April 1922. Later that year he became the Zlatoust Komsomol District Committee's Deputy Secretary, and was its Technical Secretary from April to August 1922.

The Metal Workers' Union of the Zlatoust District Committee ordered Pervukhin to Moscow in the late summer of 1922 to study. He graduated in 1929 from the Electrical Department of the Plekhanov Moscow Institute of the National Economy with a degree in electrical engineering. Following his graduation, Pervukhin started work at Mosenergo, the Moscow electric power company. In May 1936 he became the Director of the Kashirskaya Power Plant. From June to September 1937, Pervukhin worked as Mosenergo's Chief Engineer, and later that year became its acting head. Pervukhin started to work for the People's Commissariat for Heavy Industry in late 1937, and was later appointed to the post of Deputy People's Commissar for Heavy Industry in 1938, and First Deputy People's Commissars for Heavy Industry in June 1937 when Lazar Kaganovich was People's Commissar for Heavy Industry. During the Great Purge Pervukhin was promoted to Deputy Head of the Moscow Electrical Power Administration Bureau, and then its head. On 24 January 1939 Pervukin was promoted to the newly established post of People's Commissar for Electric Power Stations and was given a seat in the Communist Party's Central Committee at the 18th Party Congress.

World War II and the Stalin Era
From 1940 to 1942, during World War II (known as the Great Patriotic War in Russia), Pervukhin served as a Deputy Chairman of the Council of People's Commissars (literally, Soviet Deputy Premier), and from 1943 until 1950 he served as the Minister of Chemical Industry.  Pervukhin, alongside Boris Vannikov, was Vyacheslav Molotov's deputy on the State Defense Committee's commission responsible for the development of the Soviet atomic bomb since 1943. Along with Molotov, Pervukhin was in charge of the commission's uranium project. When Joseph Stalin signed the State Defense Committee Resolution No. 9887, he established a Special Committee with emergency powers. The Committee's main duty was to oversee the work of those who contributed to the development of the atomic bomb. Stalin personally picked the members of the committee; Pervukhin was one of nine members. Pervukhin was the Deputy Chairman under Vannikov's Chairmanship of the First Main Directorate of the Council of People's Commissars, the executive branch of the special committee. He also served as Chairman of the State Commission on the RDS-1 testing at the Semipalatinsk nuclear test site.

In 1950 Pervuhkin was once again appointed Deputy Chairman of the Council of Ministers and in 1952, at the 19th Party Congress, he was elected a member of the Presidium, the renamed Politburo. At the 35th anniversary of the October Revolution in 1952, Pervukhin delivered the main speech at the Moscow Kremlin commemoration. If Stalin was absent or could not carry out his duty as Chairman of the Council of Ministers, government meetings would be chaired, in turn by Pervukhin, Lavrentiy Beria, or Maksim Saburov.

Post-Stalin era
As part of the changes in the post-Stalin era, a collective leadership was established with both Georgy Malenkov and Nikita Khrushchev vying for control. At the very beginning, Pervukhin, along with Georgy Zhukov and Saburov, actively participated in foreign policy decision-making. Malenkov, the Chairman of the Council of Ministers, appointed Pervukhin the post of First Deputy Chairman of the Council of Ministers on 28 February 1955. From 5 March 1953 to 17 April 1954, Pervukhin was the Minister of Power and Electrical Industry, and from December 1953 to February 1955, he was Chairman of the Bureau for Energy, Chemical and Forest Industries of the Council of Ministers. On 25 December 1956 Nikolai Bulganin, the Chairman of the Council of Ministers, removed Saburov from his post as Chairman of the State Economic Commission on Current Planning and replaced him with Pervukhin. who held the post until 10 May 1957.

Pervukhin opposed Khrushchev's Regional Economic Soviet reform, whose main aim was to reduce the powers and functions of the central ministries. He told Khrushchev and other Presidium members that this reform would weaken branch administration, and that the centralisation and specialisation which had been the system's cornerstone would be lost. Instead, Pervukhin proposed to reduce the numbers of central ministries and establish territorial commissions to provide "horizontal cooperation". Later, in 1957, Pervukhin joined the Anti-Party Group in a bid to remove Khrushchev as First Secretary.

Ambassadorship to East Germany
Following the failed bid to remove Khrushchev, Pervukhin was demoted to a non-voting member of the Presidium, and became the Soviet Union's ambassador to East Germany in 1958. As ambassador, Pervukhin observed that "the presence in Berlin of an open and essentially uncontrolled border between the socialist and capitalist worlds unwittingly prompts the population to make a comparison between both parts of the city, which unfortunately, does not always turn out in favor of the Democratic [East] Berlin". Pervukin remained wary, until its very creation, of establishing a sectorial barrier between East and West Berlin; he believed that creating a barrier would increase anti-Soviet sympathies not only in Berlin but in Germany as well. Instead, he proposed three options: 1) "introducing restrictive measures" for East Germans to enter both East Berlin and West Berlin; 2) strengthening the border security; 3) stopping the free movement between the two cities. However, he did admit that closing the borders was a possibility, claiming that if the political situation worsened, the East German regime and the Soviets would not have another option.

Walter Ulbricht, the East German leader, invited Pervukhin to his summer house to discuss the East German immigration flow to West Germany. There Ulbricht told Pervukhin that if the Soviets did not react soon, East Germany would "collapse". Pervukhin discussed other problems as well, claiming that Ulbricht but also the East German leadership in general, were opposed to the Soviet Union's plan to improve relations with West Germany. When Khrushchev gave his approval to construct what would become the Berlin Wall, Pervukhin was the first to know. Ulbricht told Pervukhin of the need to create the East–West barrier at night, and he and Khrushchev would later agree to this.

At the 22nd Party Congress in 1961, Pevurkhin lost his seat in the Central Committee. He was succeeded in his post as Soviet ambassador to East Germany by Peter Abrassimov at the end of 1962.

Decorations and awards
 Hero of Socialist Labour (1949)
 Five Orders of Lenin
 Order of the October Revolution
 Order of the Red Banner of Labour

References

Bibliography
 
 
 
 

1904 births
1978 deaths
People from Chelyabinsk Oblast
People from Ufa Governorate
Politburo of the Central Committee of the Communist Party of the Soviet Union members
People's commissars and ministers of the Soviet Union
Second convocation members of the Soviet of the Union
Third convocation members of the Soviet of the Union
Fourth convocation members of the Soviet of the Union
Members of the Supreme Soviet of the Russian Soviet Federative Socialist Republic
Ambassadors of the Soviet Union to East Germany
Russian communists
Anti-revisionists
Plekhanov Russian University of Economics alumni
Heroes of Socialist Labour
Recipients of the Order of Lenin
Recipients of the Order of the Red Banner of Labour